Jon Allen Herb (born June 1, 1970) is an American former racecar owner, driver in the Indy Racing League and ARCA, and convicted sex offender.

Racing career

IRL debut
Herb made his IRL debut in the opening round of the 2000 season. Herb raced in the Delphi Indy 200 at Walt Disney World Speedway. He qualified 26th, and finished 22nd, dropping out with handling problems. Herb spent most of the rest of the year driving in the ARCA series (best finished was 11th, three times).

Herb made his Indianapolis 500 debut in 2001, finishing 27th. He competed in five other races, with a best finish of 9th at Texas. He made six more starts in 2002, but did not attempt to qualify at Indy.

Indy Pro Series
In 2004 Herb moved to the Infiniti Pro Series, where he co-owned his team with Matt Young. His first IPS start was the Freedom 100, where dropped out with a broken suspension and finished 17th. He finished in the top 10 at the next two events he entered, netting a 6th-place finish at Fontana and a 7th in the season finale in Fort Worth.

He ran a full schedule in 2005, won the race at Phoenix, and finished 7th in the season points standings.

In 23 Indy Pro Series starts from 2004 to 2006, he had one win, and a total of 15 top ten finishes.

IRL return
Herb intended to return to the IndyCar series for the 2006 Indianapolis 500 in a Playa Del Racing Panoz, of which he was a co-owner. However, he yielded the car to Roger Yasukawa, who qualified it for the race.

Herb qualified in the 27th starting position for the 2007 Indianapolis 500 and finished 32nd after crashing on lap 53.

He made two other starts in  2007. In June 2007 he raced at Texas, finishing 20th after spinning entering the pits. At Michigan, he struggled with suspension problems, and finished 20th after spinning. It was his final start.

He sold his team's cars to the league's pool of chassis for former Champ Car teams following open wheel unification prior to the 2008 IndyCar season.

Personal life
Herb was arrested by authorities in Collier County, Florida on October 4, 2013. He was charged with numerous counts of possession of child pornography. Herb's wife reportedly went to a police station after finding pictures of nude girls on Herb's laptop. Photos on the laptop also allegedly depicted Herb engaged in sexual acts with a girl who appeared to be four years old.

On January 4, 2016, Herb pleaded no contest to lewd and lascivious molestation and 13 counts of child pornography possession and was sentenced to 25 years in prison and lifetime probation. Under current Florida law he is required to serve at least 85% of his prison sentence.

Career results

Complete American open–wheel racing results
(key) (Races in bold indicate pole position)

IRL IndyCar Series

Indianapolis 500

Indy Lights

References

External links

1970 births
Living people
IndyCar Series drivers
Indianapolis 500 drivers
IndyCar Series team owners
Indy Lights drivers
Racing drivers from Milwaukee
Racing drivers from Wisconsin
Sportspeople from Milwaukee
American people convicted of child pornography offenses
American people convicted of child sexual abuse
American sportspeople convicted of crimes
U.S. F2000 National Championship drivers
ARCA Menards Series drivers